Vajihabad may refer to:
Vajihabad, Lorestan
Vajihabad, Qazvin